Martín Campilongo (generally known as Campi) is an Argentine humorist.

Awards

Nominations
 2013 Martín Fierro Awards
 Best work in humor

References

Argentine comedians
Living people
Year of birth missing (living people)
Participants in Argentine reality television series
Bailando por un Sueño (Argentine TV series) participants